David C. Long is a Republican former member of the Indiana State Senate. He represented the 16th district from 1996 to 2018.

He served as the President Pro Tempore of the Indiana State Senate from 2006 to the end of his tenure.

Prior to his election to the Senate, David Long served from 1988 through 1996 as a member of the Fort Wayne Common Council from the Fourth District.  He defeated incumbent Ben Eisbart to win the post. Mr. Eisbart had won the post by defeating incumbent Fredrick Hunter, the father-in-law of David Long. On February 13, 2018, Long announced that he would be retiring from the State Senate on November 6.

References

External links
State Senator David C. Long official Indiana State Legislature site
 

1955 births
21st-century American politicians
Indiana city council members
Republican Party Indiana state senators
Living people
Santa Clara University alumni
University of California, Davis alumni
People from Fort Wayne, Indiana